Back 2 the Game is the fourth studio album by American hip hop group Do Or Die. It was released on August 13, 2002, via Rap-A-Lot/Virgin Records. Recording sessions took place at The Legendary Traxster, Inc., at Legit Ballers Studio, at Most Wanted Studio, at Chicago Tracks, and at Chicago Recording Company. Production was handled by The Legendary Traxster, Toxic, Naki and Datanna, with J. Prince serving as executive producer. It features guest appearances from Johnny P., Twista and Yung Buk. The album peaked at No. 64 on the Billboard 200 and No. 25 on the Top R&B/Hip-Hop Albums chart.

Track listing

Sample credits
Track 4 contains portions of the composition "Be Thankful for What You Got" by William DeVaughn
Track 7 contains portions of the composition "Love You Down" by Ready for the World

Personnel
Anthony "N.A.R.D." Round – vocals
Darnell "Belo Zero" Smith – vocals
Dennis "AK47" Round – vocals
John "Johnny P" Pigram – vocals (tracks: 3, 4, 7, 9-11, 14)
Carl "Twista" Mitchell – vocals (track 3)
Jeffery "Yung Buk" Robinson – vocals (track 5)
Frederick "Toxic" Taylor – producer (tracks: 1, 3, 6), engineering, mixing
Samuel "The Legendary Traxster" Lindley – producer (tracks: 2, 5, 7-11), engineering, mixing
Daniel "Datanna" Griffin – producer (track 4)
Johnny "Naki" Moore – producer (tracks: 12, 13), engineering, mixing
Larry Sturm – engineering, mixing
Manny Mohr – engineering, mixing
Chris Steinmetz – mixing
Eddy Schreyer – mastering
James "J. Prince" Smith – executive producer
Jason Clark – artwork, design, layout
T. Hopkins – photography
Tony "Big Chief" Randle – A&R
Anzel "Int'l Red" Jennings – A&R

Charts

References

External links

2002 albums
Do or Die (group) albums
Rap-A-Lot Records albums
Albums produced by The Legendary Traxster